Sally Cecilia Hawkins (born 27 April 1976) is an English actress who began her career on stage and then moved into film. She has received several awards including a Golden Globe Award and the Berlin International Film Festival's Silver Bear for Best Actress, with nominations for a Critics' Choice Movie Award, a Screen Actors Guild Award, two Academy Awards, and two British Academy Film Awards.

After graduating from the Royal Academy of Dramatic Art, she started her career as a stage actress in productions such as Romeo and Juliet (playing Juliet), Much Ado About Nothing, and A Midsummer Night's Dream. Her first major role was in Mike Leigh's All or Nothing in 2002. She continued working with Leigh, appearing in a supporting role in Vera Drake (2004) and taking the lead in Happy-Go-Lucky (2008), for which she won several awards, including the Golden Globe Award for Best Actress in a Motion Picture – Musical or Comedy and the Silver Bear for Best Actress.

Hawkins appeared in two Woody Allen films, Cassandra's Dream (2007) and Blue Jasmine (2013); for the latter, she received a nomination for the Academy Award for Best Supporting Actress. She went on to play the lead role in Made in Dagenham (2010), Paddington (2014), Maudie (2016), and Paddington 2 (2017), and appeared in Godzilla (2014) and Godzilla: King of the Monsters (2019). For starring as Elisa Esposito, a mute cleaning woman in the romantic contemporary fantasy film The Shape of Water (2017), she earned critical acclaim and was nominated for the Academy Award for Best Actress.

She has also appeared in stage productions with the Royal Court Theatre in London, and in 2010 made her Broadway debut in Mrs. Warren's Profession. In 2012 she starred in Constellations at the Royal Court Theatre, which later moved to the Duke of York's Theatre in the West End. On television, she appeared in the BBC adaptations of Tipping the Velvet (2002) as Zena Blake, and Fingersmith (2005) as Sue Trinder. She also appeared as Anne Elliot in Persuasion (2007), ITV's adaptation of Jane Austen's novel.

Early life
Hawkins was born in Dulwich, London on 27 April 1976, the daughter of Jacqui Hawkins and Colin Hawkins, authors and illustrators of children's books. Her parents both have Irish ancestry. She has a brother, Finbar, a television and film producer with Aardman Animations, who also writes children's books.

Hawkins grew up in Blackheath in a National Trust-protected gingerbread house designed by Patrick Gwynne. She developed an interest in acting at the age of three when she went to a circus show. She intended to go into comedy but ended up doing theatre plays. She attended James Allen's Girls' School in Dulwich, and graduated from the Royal Academy of Dramatic Art in 1998.

Career
Hawkins started her career primarily as a stage actress in such productions as Accidental Death of an Anarchist, Romeo and Juliet, The Cherry Orchard, Much Ado About Nothing, A Midsummer Night's Dream and Misconceptions. She also had small appearances on television series such as Casualty and Doctors. In 1998 while still a student, she was cast as an extra in Star Wars: Episode I – The Phantom Menace.

In 2002, she played Samantha in Mike Leigh's film All or Nothing. It was the first of three films Hawkins and Leigh worked on together, the second of which was the 2004 film Vera Drake. She appeared as Slasher in the 2004 action film Layer Cake. Her first major television role came in 2005, when she played Susan Trinder in the BAFTA-nominated BBC drama Fingersmith, an adaptation of Sarah Waters' novel of the same name, in which she co-starred with Imelda Staunton. She then starred in another BBC adaptation, Patrick Hamilton's Twenty Thousand Streets Under the Sky. Between 2003 and 2005 she appeared in four episodes of the BBC comedy series Little Britain. She acted in David Hare's adaptation of Federico García Lorca's play The House of Bernarda Alba in 2005, at Royal National Theatre.

She has also lent her voice to numerous radio series such as Concrete Cow, on which she also was a writer, Ed Reardon's Week, Think the Unthinkable, Cash Cows, War with the Newts and The Party Line.

In 2006, Hawkins returned to the stage, appearing at the Royal Court Theatre in Jez Butterworth's The Winterling. During 2006 she also made uncredited appearances in Richard Ayoade's Man to Man with Dean Learner where she played various uncredited roles in various deleted scenes included on the series DVD. She was later directed by Ayoade on two of his films, The Double and Submarine. In 2007, she played Anne Elliot in the television film of Jane Austen's Persuasion. Her performance was well received by critics and was awarded a Golden Nymph. She also had a supporting role in the Woody Allen film Cassandra's Dream, starring Colin Farrell and Ewan McGregor.

In 2008, Hawkins had her breakthrough when reunited with Leigh for a third time in the 2008 comedy-drama film Happy-Go-Lucky, portraying Poppy Cross, a kindhearted primary school teacher. Roger Ebert gave the film four out of four stars, praising its humor and depth and Hawkins's acting, stating "[Sally Hawkins] is a joy to behold." Peter Bradshaw wrote in The Guardian that "Sally Hawkins plays [Poppy] superbly", while Tom Long of The Detroit News dubbed her performance "Oscar-worthy". Her performance received many accolades, including winning a Golden Globe Award for Best Actress – Motion Picture Musical or Comedy and Silver Bear for Best Actress.

Three films starring Hawkins, Made in Dagenham, Submarine and Never Let Me Go, all premiered at the 2010 Toronto International Film Festival. All three received positive reviews and Hawkins's performances were met with critical acclaim. Regarding her performance in Made In Dagenham, Roger Ebert wrote that "[Hawkins] shows an effortless lightness of being" while Xan Brooks of The Guardian remarked that "Hawkins gives a winning performance". In October 2010, she appeared on Broadway as Vivie in Mrs. Warren's Profession at the American Airlines Theatre. In 2011 she had a supporting role in the film adaptation of Jane Eyre, and was the female lead in the romantic comedy film Love Birds. In 2012, she and Rafe Spall co-starred in the play Constellations at the Royal Court Theatre and later Duke of York's Theatre. The play was met with positive reviews and won the best play category at the Evening Standard Theatre Awards. She also had a small role as Mrs Joe in the 2012 adaptation of the Charles Dickens novel Great Expectations.

In 2013, Hawkins starred opposite Cate Blanchett and was directed by Woody Allen for the second time in the critically acclaimed film Blue Jasmine, a role for which she received her first Academy Award nomination for Best Supporting Actress, as well as nods for the BAFTA, the Golden Globe and other accolades. The same year she starred in All Is Bright alongside Paul Giamatti and Paul Rudd, and had a small appearance as a receptionist in the Richard Ayoade film The Double. In 2014, she appeared in Godzilla as Dr Vivienne Graham, a scientist assisting Dr Ishiro Serizawa, played by Ken Watanabe. Godzilla received positive reviews and grossed over $529 million to become Hawkins's most seen film to that point. She reprised the role in 2019's Godzilla: King of the Monsters, which grossed $177 million in its opening weekend and subsequently became one of the highest-grossing films of 2019. She also co-starred with John Hawkes and Michael Cera in the Charlie Kaufman television pilot How and Why, which was not picked up.

Hawkins portrayed the mother of Asa Butterfield's character in the drama film X+Y, which premiered at the 2014 Toronto International Film Festival. In November 2014, she portrayed Mrs Brown in the critically acclaimed Paddington. The film is based on the children's books by Michael Bond where Paddington, an anthropomorphic bear who migrates from the jungles of Peru to the streets of London, is adopted by the Brown family. Hawkins reprised her role as Mrs Brown for the sequel, Paddington 2 (2017), which also received acclaim.

In 2017 she appeared in the Guillermo del Toro film The Shape of Water, as Elisa Esposito, a mute woman who falls in love with a captured humanoid amphibian creature. She received widespread acclaim for her performance. Matthew Norman of London Evening Standard called it a career defining performance. Mark Kermode of The Guardian called her "sublime," Mihir Fadnavis of Firstpost called it a "winning performance," while Ann Horaday writing for The Washington Post stated that "Sally Hawkins delivers a beautiful performance". Hawkins earned nominations for the Academy Award, Golden Globe Award, BAFTA Award and SAG Award for Best Actress. The film itself won Best Picture at the 90th Academy Awards. 

In 2023, Hawkins is to star in Wonka, a film which serves as a prequel to the Roald Dahl novel Charlie and the Chocolate Factory, exploring Willy Wonka's origins.

Personal life
Hawkins revealed in 2018 that she suffers from lupus, which can make it difficult for her to travel. She is also dyslexic.

She is unmarried.

Filmography

Awards and nominations

References

External links

 
 

1976 births
20th-century English actresses
21st-century English actresses
Actors with dyslexia
Actresses from London
Alumni of RADA
Audiobook narrators
Best Actress Genie and Canadian Screen Award winners
Best Musical or Comedy Actress Golden Globe (film) winners
English film actresses
English people of Irish descent
English radio actresses
English stage actresses
English television actresses
English voice actresses
Living people
People educated at James Allen's Girls' School
People from Dulwich
Silver Bear for Best Actress winners
People from Blackheath, London
People with lupus